is a Japanese baseball manga series written and illustrated by Eko Mikawa. It has been serialized via Shueisha's online manga app Shōnen Jump+ since April 2018 and has been collected in twelve tankōbon volumes as of January 2022. An original net animation (ONA) adaptation by MAPPA was streamed in October 2020 as part of the Jump Special Anime Festa 2021 online event.

Characters

Media

Manga
Bōkyaku Battery is written and illustrated by Eko Mikawa. The series began in Shueisha's Shōnen Jump+ online manga app on April 26, 2018. Shueisha has compiled its chapters into individual tankōbon volumes. The first volume was released on September 4, 2018. As of September 2, 2022, fourteen volumes have been released.

Volume list

Original net animation
The 40th issue of Shueisha's Weekly Shōnen Jump released on September 7, 2020 announced that the series would be adapted into an original net (ONA) anime as part of the Jump Special Anime Festa 2020 online event. The ONA is animated by MAPPA and directed by Parako Shinohara, with Noriko Itou as character designer and chief animation director, and Hisako Akagi as art director. It was streamed as part of the event on October 11, 2020.

Reception
The series took sixth place in the web manga category of the Next Manga Awards 2019.

References

External links
 

2020 anime ONAs
Baseball in anime and manga
Japanese webcomics
MAPPA
Shōnen manga
Shueisha manga
Webcomics in print